Deh-e Qarah Chay (also Romanized as Deh-e Qarah Chāy) is a village in Pish Khowr Rural District, Pish Khowr District, Famenin County, Hamadan Province, Iran. At the 2006 census, its population was 169, in 42 families.

References 

Populated places in Famenin County